This is a list of special function eponyms in mathematics, to cover the theory of special functions, the differential equations they satisfy, named differential operators of the theory (but not intended to include every mathematical eponym). Named symmetric functions, and other special polynomials, are included.

A
Niels Abel: Abel polynomials - Abelian function - Abel–Gontscharoff interpolating polynomial
Sir George Biddell Airy: Airy function 
Waleed Al-Salam (1926–1996): Al-Salam polynomial - Al Salam–Carlitz polynomial - Al Salam–Chihara polynomial
C. T. Anger: Anger–Weber function 
Kazuhiko Aomoto: Aomoto–Gel'fand hypergeometric function - Aomoto integral 
Paul Émile Appell (1855–1930): Appell hypergeometric series, Appell polynomial, Generalized Appell polynomials
Richard Askey: Askey–Wilson polynomial, Askey–Wilson function (with James A. Wilson)

B
Ernest William Barnes: Barnes G-function
E. T. Bell: Bell polynomials
Bender–Dunne polynomial
Jacob Bernoulli: Bernoulli polynomial
Friedrich Bessel: Bessel function, Bessel–Clifford function 
H. Blasius:  Blasius functions 
R. P. Boas, R. C. Buck: Boas–Buck polynomial
Böhmer integral
Erland Samuel Bring: Bring radical
de Bruijn function
Buchstab function
Burchnall, Chaundy: Burchnall–Chaundy polynomial

C
Leonard Carlitz: Carlitz polynomial
Arthur Cayley, Capelli: Cayley–Capelli operator
Celine's polynomial
Charlier polynomial
Pafnuty Chebyshev: Chebyshev polynomials
Elwin Bruno Christoffel, Darboux: Christoffel–Darboux relation
Cyclotomic polynomials

D
H. G. Dawson: Dawson function
Charles F. Dunkl: Dunkl operator, Jacobi–Dunkl operator, Dunkl–Cherednik operator
Dickman–de Bruijn function

E
Engel: Engel expansion
Erdélyi Artúr: Erdelyi–Kober operator 
Leonhard Euler: Euler polynomial, Eulerian integral, Euler hypergeometric integral

F
V. N. Faddeeva: Faddeeva function (also known as the complex error function; see error function)

G
C. F. Gauss: Gaussian polynomial, Gaussian distribution, etc.
Leopold Bernhard Gegenbauer: Gegenbauer polynomials 
Gottlieb polynomial
Gould polynomial
Christoph Gudermann: Gudermannian function

H
Wolfgang Hahn: Hahn polynomial, (with H. Exton) Hahn–Exton Bessel function
Philip Hall: Hall polynomial, Hall–Littlewood polynomial
Hermann Hankel: Hankel function 
Heine:  Heine functions 
Charles Hermite: Hermite polynomials
Karl L. W. M. Heun (1859 – 1929): Heun's equation
J. Horn: Horn hypergeometric series 
Adolf Hurwitz: Hurwitz zeta-function

I
I Function - V P Saxena 1982

J
Henry Jack (1917–1978) Dundee: Jack polynomial
F. H. Jackson: Jackson derivative Jackson integral 
Carl Gustav Jakob Jacobi: Jacobi polynomial

K
Joseph Marie Kampe de Feriet (1893–1982): Kampe de Feriet hypergeometric series
David Kazhdan, George Lusztig: Kazhdan–Lusztig polynomial 
Lord Kelvin: Kelvin function 
Kibble–Slepian formula 
Kirchhoff: Kirchhoff polynomial
Tom H. Koornwinder: Koornwinder polynomial 
Kostka polynomial, Kostka–Foulkes polynomial
Mikhail Kravchuk: Kravchuk polynomial

L
Edmond Laguerre: Laguerre polynomials
Johann Heinrich Lambert: Lambert W function
Gabriel Lamé: Lamé polynomial
G. Lauricella Lauricella-Saran: Lauricella hypergeometric series 
Adrien-Marie Legendre: Legendre polynomials
Eugen Cornelius Joseph von Lommel (1837–1899), physicist: Lommel polynomial, Lommel function, Lommel–Weber function

M
Ian G. Macdonald: Macdonald polynomial, Macdonald–Kostka polynomial, Macdonald spherical function
Mahler polynomial
Maitland function
Émile Léonard Mathieu: Mathieu function 
F. G. Mehler, student of Dirichlet (Ferdinand): Mehler's formula, Mehler–Fock formula, Mehler–Heine formula, Mehler functions
Meijer G-function
Josef Meixner: Meixner polynomial, Meixner-Pollaczek polynomial
Mittag-Leffler: Mittag-Leffler polynomials
Mott polynomial

P
Paul Painlevé: Painlevé function, Painlevé transcendents
Poisson–Charlier polynomial
Pollaczek polynomial

R
Giulio Racah: Racah polynomial
Jacopo Riccati: Riccati–Bessel function
Bernhard Riemann: Riemann zeta-function 
Olinde Rodrigues: Rodrigues formula
Leonard James Rogers: Rogers–Askey–Ismail polynomial, Rogers–Ramanujan identity, Rogers–Szegő polynomials

S
Schubert polynomial
Issai Schur: Schur polynomial 
Atle Selberg: Selberg integral
Sheffer polynomial
Slater's identities
Thomas Joannes Stieltjes: Stieltjes polynomial, Stieltjes–Wigert polynomials
Strömgren function
Hermann Struve: Struve function

T
Francesco Tricomi: Tricomi–Carlitz polynomial

W
Wall polynomial 
Wangerein:  Wangerein functions 
Weber function
Weierstrass: Weierstrass function
Louis Weisner: Weisner's method 
E. T. Whittaker: Whittaker function
Wilson polynomial

Z
Frits Zernike: Zernike polynomials

 
Eponyms